The Grammy Award for Best Banda Album was an award presented at the Grammy Awards, a ceremony that was established in 1958 and originally called the Gramophone Awards, to recording artists for quality albums in the banda music genre. Honors in several categories are presented at the ceremony annually by the National Academy of Recording Arts and Sciences of the United States to "honor artistic achievement, technical proficiency and overall excellence in the recording industry, without regard to album sales or chart position".

The award was first presented to Joan Sebastian in 2007 for the album Más Allá del Sol. Two posthumous nominations were announced for the 50th Grammy Awards (2008) following the deaths of three banda musicians in Mexico within one week. Shortly following the murders of Sergio Gómez, a singer with the group K-Paz de la Sierra, and Zayda Peña of the band Zayda Y Los Culpables, Los Conde trumpet player Jose Luis Aquino was found dead. In December 2007, Grammy organizers announced that Gomez along with singer Valentín Elizalde, who was killed in November 2006, were nominated for awards. Categorized under the Latin field, the award is presented for vocal or instrumental banda albums. As of 2011, Sebastian is the only artist to win the award more than once. The award has been presented to artists or groups originating from Mexico each year to date.

The award was discontinued in 2012 due to a major overhaul of Grammy categories. The Best Banda Album category merged with the Best Norteño Album category to form the new Best Banda or Norteño Album category.

Recipients

 Each year is linked to the article about the Grammy Awards held that year.

See also

 Latin Grammy Award for Best Banda Album
 List of Grammy Award categories

References

General
  Note: User must select the "Latin" category as the genre under the search feature.

Specific

Album awards
Awards established in 2007
Awards disestablished in 2011
Banda music
Banda Album
Banda Album
.
Banda Album